William Woodward (unknown – 4 July 1862) was an English first-class cricketer who played for Nottingham Cricket Club (aka Nottinghamshire). Woodward's batting style is unknown, though it is known he occasionally played as a wicket-keeper. He was born in Nottingham, where he was christened on 26 November 1813; died in Barrie, Ontario.

Woodward made his first-class debut for Nottingham against Sheffield in 1830 at the Hyde Park Ground in Sheffield. His next appearances were in 1834 when Nottingham played two matches against Cambridge Town Club at Parker's Piece and the Forest New Ground. He made a further appearance for the club in that season against Sheffield. The following year he made two appearances for Nottinghamshire against Sussex. Woodward played in six first-class matches, scoring 27 runs at an average of 3.37, with a highest score of 13.

References

External links

Year of birth unknown
1862 deaths
Cricketers from Nottingham
English cricketers
Nottingham Cricket Club cricketers